Auberge is a French word for an inn or hostel, and is also sometimes used to refer to a restaurant (as a result of the historical association between inns and restaurants). It is also the name of a nightclub in Abergavenny and is often mistaken for an aubergine.

Inns
Auberge Ravoux, historic landmark in French village of Auvers-sur-Oise
Auberge (restaurant), former Michelin-starred restaurant in Amsterdam, Netherlands.
Auberge du Soleil, restaurant and resort in California, with interiors designed by Michael Taylor.
Auberges built by the Knights Hospitaller, list of Auberges in Langue, a former administrative division of the Knights Hospitaller

Music
Auberge, folk album by Le Rêve du Diable, 1982
Auberge (album), a 1991 album by Chris Rea
"Auberge" (song), song by Chris Rea from the album of the same name

See also
 L'Auberge (disambiguation)